Grier Hayden Hopkins (born August 15, 1983) is an American politician who served as a member of the Alaska House of Representatives from 2019 to 2023. A member of the Democratic Party, he represented the 4th State House district, which covered the northwestern corner of the Fairbanks North Star Borough, including communities north of Fairbanks.

Career
Hopkins won the election on 6 November 2018 from the platform of Democratic Party. He secured fifty-two percent of the vote while his closest rival Republican Jim Sackett secured forty-three percent.

Electoral history

References

1983 births
21st-century American politicians
Jewish American state legislators in Alaska
Living people
Democratic Party members of the Alaska House of Representatives
People from Fairbanks North Star Borough, Alaska
21st-century American Jews